The Yugo-Vostochnaya Gremyakha mine is one of the largest titanium mines in Russia.  The mine is located in Murmansk Oblast. The mine has reserves amounting to 585.3 million tonnes of ore grading 8.51% titanium.

See also 
 List of mines in Russia

References 

Titanium mines in Russia